CBC Sports is the division of the Canadian Broadcasting Corporation responsible for English-language sports broadcasting. The CBC's sports programming primarily airs on CBC Television, CBCSports.ca, and CBC Radio One. (The CBC's French-language Radio-Canada network also produces sports programming.)

Once the country's dominant sports broadcaster, in recent years it has lost many of its past signature properties – such as the Canadian Football League, Toronto Blue Jays baseball, Canadian Curling Association championships, the Olympic Games for a period, the FIFA World Cup, and the National Hockey League – to the cable specialty channels TSN and Sportsnet. CBC has maintained partial rights to the NHL as part of a sub-licensing agreement with current rightsholder Rogers Media (maintaining the Saturday-night Hockey Night in Canada and playoff coverage), although this coverage is produced by Sportsnet, as opposed to the CBC itself as was the case in the past.

As a result of funding reductions from the federal government and decreased revenues, in April 2014, CBC announced it would no longer bid for professional sports broadcasting rights. The CBC has since used its digital platforms to provide overflow coverage of events not on television, and simulcasts of television coverage. Since then, CBC's in-house sports coverage has been largely focused on Olympic sports, other domestic amateur and semi-professional competitions such as the Canadian Hockey League (CHL), along with coverage of Spruce Meadows' show jumping competitions.

The majority of CBC Television's sports coverage is broadcast on weekend afternoons, under the blanket title Road to the Olympic Games (formerly CBC Sports Weekend). CBC Sports also streams all of its programming, as well as other event coverage not shown on television, via its website and digital platforms.

Former CEO of Curling Canada Greg Stremlaw was the head of CBC Sports from April 10, 2015 to January, 2019.

Sports properties

Current/upcoming
Olympics and Pan Am
2024 Summer Olympics

Hockey
National Hockey League - Hockey Night in Canada (1952–present)
Series outsourced to Rogers Media under the NHL on Sportsnet series since 2014
Weekly Saturday night doubleheader and at least one playoff game each night a playoff game is played
Canadian Hockey League (2021–present)
Early-season weekend games across its constituent leagues.
Additional streaming regular-season games.

Alpine Skiing
FIS World Cup races

Baseball
Little League Canadian Championships

Basketball
Canadian Elite Basketball League
 All games streaming (2019–2022), 7 regular-season games and the championship game on CBC Television (2020–2022)

Curling
Grand Slam of Curling (weekend coverage of selected events) - 2007–present

Equine sports
Spruce Meadows

Figure Skating
World Figure Skating Championships and other International Skating Union competitions, excluding domestic events (rights owned by TSN)

Football
Vanier Cup - beginning with the 55th (2019) edition

Rugby
 Toronto Wolfpack (streaming)

Track & Field
Diamond League events
World Athletics Championships

Past properties 
Hockey
AHL on CBC – 10 games during the 2010–11 season

Horse racing
Queen's Plate

Soccer
Major League Soccer - Toronto FC and MLS Cup (2007–2010)
2007 FIFA U-20 World Cup
FIFA World Cup (1954–2014)
CONCACAF Canadian Championship (2008) - Most games show live on bold, then on tape delay on CBC.
 Canadian Premier League – 20 games (10 streaming only).

Baseball
Major League Baseball
 Major League Baseball on CBC - (1953–2008)
Toronto Blue Jays - 1977–1980, 1992–2002, 2007–2008
Montreal Expos - 1969–1989

Multi-sports competitions
Olympics on CBC
Summer Olympics - 1956–2008, 2016, 2020
Summer Paralympics - 2004, 2008, 2016
Winter Olympics - 1956–2006, 2014, 2018, 2022
1999 Pan American Games - (sublicenced to TSN)
2015 Pan American Games/2015 Parapan American Games - (soccer sublicensed to Sportsnet)
2019 Pan American Games/2019 Parapan American Games (streaming only)
2017 North American Indigenous Games

Basketball
National Basketball Association
 NBA on CBC - (2007–2010)
Toronto Raptors - (2007–2010)

Football
 Canadian Football League (CFL on CBC) - (1952–2007)

Figure Skating
Skate Canada International and Canadian Figure Skating Championships

Curling
Cross Canada Curling - 1961–1965
CBC Championship Curling - 1966–1972
CBC Curling Classic - 1973–1979
Canadian Curling Association - 1961–2008

Canoe Sprint
2009 ICF Canoe Sprint World Championships

Tennis
Rogers Cup (Semi-finals and finals through 2015)

Notable personalities (past and present)

Ernie Afaganis
Steve Armitage
David Archer
John Badham
Leo Cahill
Cassie Campbell-Pascall
Don Chevrier
Don Cherry
Bob Cole
Ward Cornell
James Curry
Chris Cuthbert
Keith Dancy
John Davidson
Jason de Vos
Gary Dornhoefer
Steve Douglas
Don Duguid
Terry Evanshen
Darren Flutie
Greg Frers
Elliotte Friedman
Tom Harrington
Foster Hewitt
Kelly Hrudey
Joe Galat
Danny Gallivan
Bob Goldham
Mike Harris
Bill Hewitt
Dave Hodge
Jim Hughson
Dick Irvin Jr.
Brenda Irving
Russ Jackson
Colleen Jones
Khari Jones
Dan Kelly
Danny Kepley
Ron Lancaster
Mark Lee
Ron MacLean
Jeff Marek
Norm Marshall
Doug Maxwell
Joan McCusker
Brian McFarlane
Wes McKnight
Mike Milbury
Greg Millen
Gord Miller
Sean Millington
Howie Meeker
Bob Moir
Harry Neale
Scott Oake
Mitch Peacock
Andi Petrillo
Bruce Rainnie
Mickey Redmond
Chico Resch
Ted Reynolds
Frank Rigney
Jim Robson
Paul Romanuk
Scott Russell
Sandra Schmirler
Craig Simpson
P.J. Stock
Glen Suitor
Eric Tillman
Alex Trebek
Chris Walby
Jack Wells
John Wells
Brian Williams
Don Wittman

Directors
Ron Devion (1980–1982)
Denis Harvey (1982–1983)
Don MacPherson (1984–1988)
Arthur Smith (1988–1990)
Alan Clark (1990 – December 8, 1999)
Nancy Lee (December 9, 1999 – February 28, 2007)
Scott Moore (March 1, 2007 – April 3, 2011)
Jeffrey Orridge (April 4, 2011 – April 9, 2015)
Greg Stremlaw (April 10, 2015 – January, 2019)
Chris Wilson (July 2, 2019 – present)

Hall of Fame
CBC Sports Hall of Fame recognizes those broadcasters of CBC Sports who have made a unique and lasting contribution to CBC and to the sports broadcasting industry.

 Ernie Afaganis
 Don E. Brown
 Alan Clark
 Gordon Craig
 Margaret Davis
 Tom Fisk
 Danny Gallivan
 Geoff Gowan
 Foster Hewitt
 Dick Irvin Jr.
 Terry Leibel
 Joan Mead
 Howie Meeker
 Bob Moir
 George Retzlaff
 Ted Reynolds
 Fred Sgambatti
 Jim Thompson
 Fred Walker
 Don Wittman

Proposed CBC SportsPlus channel 
In 2008, the CBC received CRTC approval for a sports specialty channel, "CBC SportsPlus", which would have aired a mix of amateur and professional sports. The application was controversial, with CTVglobemedia, Rogers Media, and The Score among others filing interventions against the channel for being unduly competitive with existing sports channels (therefore violating the CRTC's then-policy of genre protection among specialty channels). They showed particular concern for the CBC stating that it planned to devote 75% of its programming to professional sports. The CRTC approved the license application, but restricted it to only devoting 30% of its schedule per-week to professional sports, with only 10% of this quota allowed to be devoted to "professional stick and/or ball sports".

The channel, however, never launched.

References